We Sing Deutsche Hits is a 2011 karaoke game part of the We Sing family of games, developed by French studio Le Cortex. The game features 100% German artists and is set to only be released in the German-speaking territories.

Gameplay
The gameplay is similar to the SingStar set of video games. Players are required to sing along with music in order to score points, matching pitch and rhythm. The game has anticheat technology whereby tapping or humming will register on the screen but no points will be awarded. We Sing Deutsche Hits also contains the addition of 'Star Notes' that allows the player to score even more points by matching the pitch and rhythm of certain hard to score parts of songs.

 40 full licensed songs with music videos where available
 Solo Mode
 Multiplayer modes - Group Battle, We Sing, Versus, Pass the Mic, First to X, Expert, Blind and Marathon
 Real Karaoke mode
 Jukebox mode
 Singing Lessons
 Award System
 Customisable backgrounds
 Four Microphones
 Integrates with a USB hub

Track listing

The complete track list for We Sing Deutsche Hits was announced on the Flashpoint website, the German distributor for the game.

2Raumwohnung - Besser Geht's Nicht
Christina Stürmer - Fieber
Costa Cordalis - Anita
Culcha Candela - Hamma!
Deichkind - Remmidemmi
Die Atzen - Disco Pogo
Die Fantastischen Vier - Gebt Uns Ruhig Die Schuld
Die Toten Hosen - Strom
DJ Ötzi & Nik P. - Ein Stern (...der deinen Namen trägt)
Extrabreit - Flieger Grüss Mir Die Sonne
Fettes Brot - Jein
Geier Sturzflug - Pure Lust Am Leben
Hans Albers - Auf Der Reeperbahn Nachts Um Halb Eins
Heinz Rühmann - Ein Freund, Ein Guter Freund
Hildegard Knef - Für Mich Soll's Rote Rosen Regnen
Howard Carpendale  - Hello Again
Hubert Kah - Sternenhimmel
Ich + Ich - Vom Selben Stern
Jan Delay - Feuer
Juli - Geile Zeit
Kettcar - Landungsbrücken Raus
LaFee - Heul Doch
Marianne Rosenberg - Er Gehört Zu Mir
Max Raabe & Palast Orchester - Kein Schwein Ruft Mich An
Mia - Tanz Der Moleküle
Münchner Freiheit - Ohne Dich
Nena - Nur Geträumt
Polarkreis 18 - Allein Allein
Revolverheld - Freunde Bleiben
Rio Reiser - König Von Deutschland
Rosenstolz - Liebe Ist Alles
Sido - Hey Du!
Söhne Mannheims - Und Wenn Ein Lied
Sportfreunde Stiller - Ein Kompliment
Udo Lindenberg - Sonderzug Nach Pankow
Udo Lindenberg & Jan Delay - Ganz Anders
Unheilig - Geboren Um Zu Leben
Wir Sind Helden - Aurélie
Wolfgang Petry - Wahnsinn
Xavier Naidoo - Dieser Weg

Peripherals

Due to hardware limitations with the Wii only having two USB ports, a USB hub is shipped with certain retail sku's to add more USB ports. The game uses the standard Logitech USB microphone for the Wii.

See also
We Sing
We Sing Encore
We Sing Robbie Williams
SingStar
Karaoke Revolution
Lips

References

External links 
We Sing Website

Karaoke video games
Music video games
Europe-exclusive video games
Video games developed in France
Wii games
Wii-only games
2011 video games
THQ Nordic games
We Sing
Wired Productions games
Multiplayer and single-player video games